Men's 10 metre running target shooting made its first Olympic appearance at the 1992 Summer Olympics, replacing 50 metre running target on the programme. The events are similar, the main changes being the shortened distance (and correspondingly shortened target path), the use of airguns instead of small-bore rifles, and the circular target as opposed to the 50 metre target depicting a wild boar. Michael Jakosits became the inaugural champion and established two Olympic records.

Qualification round

OR Olympic record – Q Qualified for semifinal

Final

OR Olympic record

References

Sources

Shooting at the 1992 Summer Olympics
Men's events at the 1992 Summer Olympics